Sankhaburi is a district (amphoe) in the southern part of Chai Nat province, central Thailand.

History
The name of Sankhaburi or Sawankhaburi has the same meaning as the name of the nearby province, Nakhon Sawan, is "Heavenly City". It was originally known as Phraek Si Racha (the term "Phraek" is a Mon language meaning "water intersection").

The history of Sankhaburi began at about 2,500 years ago. At that time, Sankhaburi depends on Suphannaphum kingdom (present-day Suphanburi) in this area to Nakhon Sawan as an important trade junction.

Geography
Sabkhaburi is located on the Noi river banks, a branch of the Chao Phraya river.

Neighbouring districts are (from the west clockwise) Hankha, Mueang Chai Nat, and Sapphaya of Chai Nat Province;  In Buri and Bang Rachan of Sing Buri province; and Doem Bang Nang Buat of Suphan Buri province.

Administration
The district is divided into eight sub-districts (tambons), which are further subdivided into 92 villages (mubans). Phraek Si Racha is a township (thesaban tambon) which covers parts of tambon Phraek Si Racha. There are a further eight tambon administrative organizations (TAO).

References

External links
amphoe.com (Thai)

Sankhaburi